David Berni is a Canadian actor, stand-up comedian and writer.

Life and career
David Berni is an actor who currently voices the character Frank on Go, Dog. Go!, Bernie on Ollie's Pack and  Bird Bud on The Snoopy Show. He is also known for voicing Brent Mclean and Hector on Cloudy with a Chance of Meatballs, Count Dracula on Hotel Transylvania, and Gawayne on Mysticons.
 
David has also been nominated for 3 Canadian Screen Awards (Gemini Awards) in the Best Performance category for his work on Rocket Monkeys, Ruby Gloom, and Iggy Arbuckle. He has also been nominated for 4 ACTRA Awards in the best performance category for his work on Ollie’s Pack, Cloudy With a Chance of Meatballs: The Series, Rocket Monkeys, and Almost Naked Animals.

David also received critical praise for his uncanny portrayal of hockey superstar Phil Esposito, in the TV mini-series Canada-Russia '72.
In the advertising world, David has voiced numerous commercials for companies such as Doritos, Pepsi, McDonald's, Volvo, and Kelloggs.

Filmography

Film and Television

References

External links
 

Living people
Canadian male comedians
Canadian male film actors
Canadian male television actors
Canadian male voice actors
Comedians from Toronto
Male actors from Toronto
Year of birth missing (living people)